"Constructive" or "productive" imagination denotes the process resulting in formation of novel mental images, as opposed to simple recall that refers to remembering of a previously seen picture. On a neurological level, simple recall involves activation of an existing object-encoding neuronal ensemble (objectNE) in the posterior cortical hot zone; synchronous resonant activity of the objectNE results in conscious perception of the object. Constructive imagination, on the other hand, involves various mechanisms that modify an objectNE or assemble different objectNEs into novel combinations.

Constructive imagination is further divided into active imagination driven by the prefrontal cortex (PFC) and spontaneous PFC-independent imagination such as REM-sleep dreaming, daydreaming, hallucinations, and spontaneous insight.

Neuroscience